Gassaway Sellman Grimes (November 16, 1816 – July 3, 1875) was a physician who practiced in Maryland for several years. He married Susan Dorsey, a descendant of the Dorsey family.

Early years
Dr. G. S. Grimes was born on November 16, 1816 in Maryland to Cornelius Grimes, who served in the War of 1812, and Elizabeth Sellman. He attended the old Barnesville Academy. Grimes graduated from the University of Maryland School of Medicine in 1838.

Grimes married Susan H. Dorsey on June 25, 1839 in Frederick County, Maryland, a descendant of Edward Dorsey. By 1840 he moved to Carroll County, Maryland. Grimes was once part of a convention in support of William Henry Harrison for President in the election of 1840. He was a member of the Ridgeville Methodist Episcopal Church.

City Hotel

He was once proprietor of the City Hotel in Frederick, Maryland with his brother-in-law Basil E. Dorsey.

Civil War
Grimes served for the Confederacy during the American Civil War, and was taken prisoner.

Personal
He was a descendant of colonel Nicholas Gassaway, and the grandfather of sculptor Rudulph Evans.

His daughter Kate married T. M. Turner. His son Robert Lee was also a physician. Grimes died at his house in Gainesboro. He is buried at Prospect Hill Cemetery in Front Royal.

References

External links

Physicians from Maryland
1816 births
1875 deaths
People from Warren County, Virginia
University of Maryland School of Medicine alumni
People from Carroll County, Maryland
People from Frederick County, Maryland
Confederate States Army personnel
19th-century American physicians
Dorsey family of Maryland